TSS Olga was a steam turbine cargo vessel operated by the London and North Western Railway from 1887 to 1908.

History

She was built by Cammell Laird for the London and North Western Railway in 1888 and put on the Holyhead - Dublin route. She was one of a trio of ships built over 4 years for this route, all of a similar size.

Olga was the first L&NWR ship to be fitted with triple engines.

She was disposed of in 1908.

References

1887 ships
Steamships
Ships built on the River Mersey
Ships of the London and North Western Railway